Poznań–Kobylnica Airport , also referred to as Ligowiec Airport after a nearby railway station, is a privately owned, public use airport located in Kobylnica near Poznań. The airport is owned by the Poznań Wanda Modlibowska Aero Club.

History
The airport was built by the Germans during World War II. It was captured by Soviet forces on 29 January 1945 and served as a base for Polikarpov Po-2 bombers during the Battle of Poznań.

Future
Around 2019, the Aero Club, which owns the airport, announced it would be moving its base of operations to the EPPG airport in Kąkolewo and selling the Kobylnica airport to a developer. A proposal has been made to redevelop the area of the airport into a "compact city" for 8 thousand people with 133 buildings (98 of them residential), one reaching up to a height of 160 metres, and a new communication node.

Infrastructure
The airport has one runway, a 750 × 100 m (2,461 × 328 ft) grass strip numbered 07/25. There are also several hangars.

References

Airports in Poland
Privately owned airports